Shin Cheol-jin is a South Korean actor. He made his debut in the 1976 play Naughty in the West.

Filmography

Television series

Film

Awards and nominations
 2005 Korean Theater Actors Association Actor of the Year
 2008 The 12th Hector Theater Awards Theatrical Award of the Year
 2009 Yomiuri Theatrical Awards Male Actor Award

Notes

References

External links 
 
 

1956 births
Living people
20th-century South Korean male actors
21st-century South Korean male actors
South Korean male film actors
South Korean male television actors